A free box is a box or location used to allow for people to rid themselves of excess items without the inconvenience of a garage sale.  When someone has items they wish to be rid of, but which might be useful to another person, they are set out and given to whoever wants them.  If, after a period, no one has claimed the items, the contents of the box may be donated to a charity like Goodwill or The Salvation Army.

Free boxing is implemented at the University of Saskatchewan, in Victoria, British Columbia, in Isla Vista, California, and in Crestone and Telluride, Colorado.

An online version of a similar concept is The Freecycle Network.

The University of Guelph, in Guelph, Ontario, runs a free table for several weeks of the school year. New College of Florida is home to a student-run free table (open throughout the school year).

Gallery

See also 
 Public bookcase

References

External links
 "The FREEBOX" YouTube video
 "Telluride Colorado Freebox do's and don'ts YouTube video public service program by Telluride TV, Channel 12, a cable TV station.

Distribution (marketing)
Reuse